Martin Cox (born August 12, 1956) is a former Canadian Football League wide receiver.

Cox played his college football at Vanderbilt University. In his first CFL season, with the Ottawa Rough Riders, he caught 32 passes for 546 yards and 7 touchdowns, winning him the Frank M. Gibson Trophy as top rookie in the CFL East. He later played with the Toronto Argonauts and Winnipeg Blue Bombers.

Cox finished his career in 1983 in the United States Football League with the Tampa Bay Bandits.

Notes

1956 births
Living people
American players of Canadian football
Canadian Football League Rookie of the Year Award winners
Ottawa Rough Riders players
People from Mullins, South Carolina
Tampa Bay Bandits players
Toronto Argonauts players
Vanderbilt Commodores football players
Winnipeg Blue Bombers players
Canadian football wide receivers
American football wide receivers